Rainbow Girl (Dori Aandraison of the planet Xolnar) is a fictional character and a DC Comics super heroine. 

Rainbow Girl or The Rainbow Girl may also refer to:

Rainbow Girl, painting by Ian Scott (artist)
"Rainbow Girl", song on 2009 album Butterflies and Elvis by  Yohanna
"Rainbow Girl", 1969 single by Bobby Lord
"Rainbow Girl", musical work by S3RL
"Rainbow Girl", track on 2007 album No Money! Still Be Happy! by Awaking (duo)
The Rainbow Girl (film), 1917 silent film by Rollin S. Sturgeon
The Rainbow Girl (musical), 1918 stage musical starring Beth Lydy

See also
 International Order of the Rainbow for Girls, a Masonic youth service organization
Rainbows (Girl Guides), the youngest section of GirlGuiding in the UK